The French cruiser Desaix was one of three  armored cruisers built for the French Navy in the first decade of the 20th century. Designed for overseas service and armed with eight  guns, the ships were smaller and less powerfully armed than their predecessors. Completed in 1904, Desaix was initially assigned to the Mediterranean Squadron before she was transferred to the Atlantic Division the following year, where she served as a flagship. The cruiser returned to the Mediterranean in 1906, but only remained there for a year before rejoining the Atlantic Division. Desaix was in reserve from 1909 to 1914.

As tensions rose shortly before the beginning of World War I in August 1914, the ship was reactivated. When the war began she was assigned to defend Allied shipping in the English Channel and intercept German ships attempting to pass through. Transferred back to the Mediterranean in early 1915, Desaix spent the next year patrolling off the coast of the Ottoman Levant and in the central Mediterranean. To help protect Allied shipping from German commerce raiders, the ship was transferred to French West Africa in mid-1916 and remained there for the rest of the war. She served in the Far Eastern Division in 1919–1921 and was decommissioned shortly after her return. Desaix was sold for scrap in 1927.

Design and description
The Dupleix-class ships were much smaller and more lightly armed than the preceding . The cruisers displaced  as designed. They normally had a crew of 19 officers and 550 enlisted men, but accommodated 24 officers and 583 enlisted men when serving as a flagship.

The sister ships' propulsion machinery consisted of three vertical triple-expansion steam engines, each driving a single propeller shaft, using steam provided by water-tube boilers, but the types of machinery differed between them.

Armament and protection
The ships of the Dupleix class had a main armament that consisted of eight quick-firing (QF) Canon de 164.7 mm Modèle 1893–1896 guns. They were mounted in four twin-gun turrets, one each fore and aft of the superstructure and a pair of wing turrets amidships. The cruisers' secondary armament consisted of four QF Canon de  Modèle de 1893 guns on single mounts in casemates in the hull. For defense against torpedo boats, they carried ten  and four  Hotchkiss guns, all of which were in single mounts. The ship were also equipped with two above-water  torpedo tubes, one on each broadside.

The face and sides of the gun turrets were protected by  Harvey face-hardened armor plates. The 100-millimeter guns were in unprotected embrasures in the hull. The sides of the elliptical conning tower were 100 to 120 millimeters thick.

Service history
Named after the French Revolutionary-era General Louis Desaix, the ship was ordered from Ateliers et Chantiers de la Loire on 28 December 1897. Construction was considerably delayed when the armament configuration was revised after the ship had already been laid down; the contract for Desaix was revised to account for the changes on 3 September 1899. The cruiser was laid down at their shipyard in Nantes in early 1899 and launched on 21 March 1901. Desaix began her sea trials on 6 August 1902 and she was finally commissioned on 5 April 1904. The ship cost 19,068,975 francs.

Desaix was assigned to the Mediterranean Fleet's Light Squadron upon completion, together with her sister . Desaix relieved her other sister, as the flagship of the Atlantic Division in September 1905, but replaced Kléber in the Light Squadron when she returned to the Mediterranean in November 1906. Desaix rejoined the Atlantic Division in 1908, but was placed in reserve in 1909 and remained in that status for the next five years.

World War I
As tensions rose during the July Crisis of 1914, Desaix, Kléber and the other cruisers in reserve were reactivated. The sisters were assigned to the 3rd Light Division ( (DL)) of the 2nd Light Squadron which was tasked to defend the English Channel in conjunction with the British. The 3rd DL was on station in the western end of the Channel by 4 August, where they were tasked to intercept German shipping and provide distant cover to the smaller ships escorting the transports conveying the British Expeditionary Force to France.

Improved defenses in the Channel and the stabilization of the front in early 1915 allowed the cruisers to be released from their tasks, so Desaix was assigned to the 3rd Squadron upon her arrival in the Eastern Mediterranean on 16 February. The squadron was tasked to patrol the area between Port Said, Egypt, and Alexandretta, Ottoman Syria. The cruiser was detached in May to assist the 1st Naval Army in the Central Mediterranean with searching for German shipping near Italian ports; Desaix was tasked to watch Palermo, Sicily from 18 May. After 6 June, when the Italians agreed to take over that duty, the cruiser was assigned to reinforce the 2nd DL as it patrolled the area between Capo Colonna in southern Italy and the easternmost point of the Greek island of Crete. Later that month, she rejoined the 3rd Squadron and was tasked to help blockade the Ottoman coast from Latakia, Syria, to Mersin, together with the protected cruiser  and the seaplane carrier . The ships helped to rescue a group of Armenian refugees who were being pursued by the Ottomans from the mountains near Antioch, Syria, on 12–13 September.

The successes of German merchant raiders like  in 1916 caused the Allies to transfer cruisers to the Atlantic to protect their shipping. Desaix joined her sisters in the newly formed 6th DL in April 1916, based in Dakar, French West Africa. To release manpower for higher-priority patrol boats, the 6th DL was reduced to two ships and renamed the Coast of Africa Division on 18 May 1917. The division was disbanded on 14 September when Dupleix was sent home to be placed in reserve. Desaix remained at Dakar for the rest of the war, tasked to escort convoys in the South Atlantic.

The ship returned to France after the war, but was assigned to the Far Eastern Division in 1919. Departing in November her service there was uneventful and the ship arrived back in France on 31 March 1921 after which she was decommissioned. Desaix was stricken from the Navy List on 27 July, but was not sold for scrap until 1927.

Citations

References 
 

 

Dupleix-class cruisers
Ships built in France
1901 ships
World War I cruisers of France